The Kolkata Knight Riders (KKR) are a franchise cricket team based in Kolkata, India, which plays in the Indian Premier League (IPL). They are one of the ten teams that are competing in the Indian Premier League. Their current captain is Shreyas Iyer and their coach is Chandrakant Pandit.

Listing criteria 
In general the top five are listed in each category (except when there is a tie for the last place among the five, when all the tied record holders are noted).

Listing notation 
Team notation
 (200–3) indicates that a team scored 200 runs for three wickets and the innings was closed, either due to a successful run chase or if no playing time remained
 (200) indicates that a team scored 200 runs and was all out

Batting notation
 (100) indicates that a batsman scored 100 runs and was out
 (100*) indicates that a batsman scored 100 runs and was not out

Bowling notation
 (5–20) indicates that a bowler has captured 5 wickets while conceding 20 runs

Currently playing
  indicates a current cricketer

Start date
 indicates the date the match starts

Team history

Results by season

Head-to-head records

Result records

Largest wins (by runs)

Largest wins (by balls remaining)

Largest wins (by wickets)

Narrowest wins (by runs)

Narrowest wins (by balls remaining)

Narrowest wins (by wickets)

Tied matches

Largest defeats (by runs)

Largest defeats (by balls remaining)

Largest defeats (by wickets)

Narrowest defeats (by runs)

Narrowest defeats (by balls remaining)

Narrowest defeats (by wickets)

Team scoring records

Highest totals

Lowest totals

Highest totals conceded

Lowest totals conceded

Highest match total

Lowest match total

Individual records (batting)

Most runs

Highest scores

Highest career averages

Highest strike rates

Most half-centuries

Most centuries

Most sixes

Most fours

Highest strike rates in an innings

Most sixes in an innings

Most fours in an innings

Most runs in a season

Most ducks

Individual records (bowling)

Most wickets

Best figures in an innings

Best career averages

Best career economy rates

Best career strike rates

Most four-wickets hauls and above in an innings

Best economy rates in an innings

Best strike rates in an innings

Most runs conceded in a match

Most wickets in a season

Hat-tricks

Individual records (wicket-keeping)

Most dismissals

Most catches

Most stumpings

Most dismissals in an innings

Most dismissals in a season

Individual records (fielding)

Most catches

Most catches in an innings

Most catches in a season

Individual records (other)

Most matches

Most matches as captain

Partnership records

Highest partnerships by wicket

Highest partnerships by runs

External links
IPL team Kolkata Knight Riders web page on official IPL T20 website - IPLT20.com
Official Site

References 

2008 establishments in West Bengal
Lists of Indian cricket records and statistics
Stats
Indian Premier League lists